All Things Will Unwind is the third studio album from the American rock group My Brightest Diamond.

Content
The eleven-track was released with Asthmatic Kitty, on 10 October 2011. It was arranged and produced by Shara Worden, with co-production by Rob Moose. Engineering and mixing was by Pat Dillett, with assistance from Jon Altschuler and Ehren Ebbage, recording was by Zac Rae at The Bank, and mastering by UE Nastasi at Sterling Sound. Album design and layout is by DM Stith, and photography by Denny Renshaw. Worden worked on All Things Will Unwind the New York's yMusic, a chamber group that blends contemporary classical and art-pop music for the album. It contains lush compositions with woodwinds, violins, flutes, piccolos, ukuleles, synthesizers, heavy bass percussion, and operatic vocals, as well as challenging and creative lyrics. Conceptually, the album is about Detroit, Michigan, class and race, politics, and life and death.

The songs "She Does Not Brave the War (But She Saves the Day)" and "I Have Never Loved Someone" were written for Worden's then-newborn son, the latter about making an enduring legacy of love. The music video for "We Added It Up" was released on 12 October 2011, and contains footage of a pair of dancers, and a mostly silhouetted, singing Worden.

Reception

Paste describes the album as "pure, conventional orchestral pop. Gone are the noir-rock undertones and the bubbling tension of her earlier albums, and they are replaced in favor of unlimited access to the local orchestra's storage closet," adding "it's a heady and abstract album that feels more like it should be studied than enjoyed." A review from PopMatters call is a "deeply layered record with lots to listen to and appreciate in every sense. It's also just a lot of fun as MBD clearly enjoys being in character and seeing where the songs taker her," and Filter says it is "a cohesive trek that leaves the listener enraptured by Worden's talent and undeniable magnetism." A mixed review in Pitchfork notes that "the carefulness of All Things Will Unwind can feel impenetrable sometimes, and while her closest musical analogue is the equally ambitious Joanna Newsom, Worden lacks Newsom's oddball vulnerability," and concludes with "to be so many things, to harness and perfect so many disparate sounds-- makes her work feel more distant than it should."

Track listing
All songs are written by Shara Worden, except where indicated.

Personnel
Brad Albetta – bass, piano and Moog synth
Thomas Bartlett – Rhodes piano on "High Low Middle"
Tim Fite – celesta, fireball, percussion, synth bass on "Ding Dang"
Zac Rae – marimba, pianet, prepared piano, Roland RS-09, Roland Jupiter 8, guitar, Mellotron, vibes, celesta, Wurlitzer, Orchestron and bells
Justin Riddle – percussion on "Ding Dang"
Brian Snow – drums
DM Stith – vocals and acoustic guitar
Brain Wolfe – drums
Shara Worden – vocals, baritone ukelele, bells, Authoharp, Mbira and pump organ

yMusic
Hideaki Aomori – clarinet and bass clarinet
CJ Camerieri – trumpet, horn and pump organ
Clarice Jensen 
Rob Moose – violin, guitars and banjo
Nadia Sirota – viola
Alex Sopp – flute and piccolo

References
Citations

Bibliography

External links
Asthmatic Kitty press release for All Things Will Unwind

2011 albums
My Brightest Diamond albums
Asthmatic Kitty albums